Asikni may refer to: 
 Asikni (river), an ancient name of the Chenab River of India and Pakistan.
 Asikni (goddess), a Hindu goddess also known as Panchajani or Virani.